"Ramrod" is a song written by Al Casey and originally released as the A-side of a single released by the obscure Ford record label in Los Angeles in 1957, backed on its B-side by the Duke Ellington/Juan Tizol/Irving Mills song "Caravan". Al Casey actually plays lead guitar on both sides of this release, but the record was credited to "Duane Eddy and the Rock-A-Billies".
The original recording of "Ramrod" was overdubbed on July 28, 1958 with Plas Johnson's saxophone and "rebel yells" were also added by the Sharps (later called The Rivingtons) for the song's second release on Jamie Records (Jamie 1109) in August 1958, now with the song "The Walker" on its B-side (written by Lee Hazlewood and Duane Eddy) and this release reached #17 on the R&B chart and #27 on the Billboard Hot 100 in 1958. 
The song later also appeared on Duane Eddy's 1958 album, Have 'Twangy' Guitar Will Travel.

"Ramrod" was recorded at Audio Recorders recording studio in Phoenix, Arizona, and produced by Lee Hazlewood and Lester Sill.

Other versions
The Challengers released a version on their 1963 album, Surfbeat.

References
  Original issue of "Ramrod"/"Caravan" by Duane Eddy And His Rock-A-Billies on Ford, 1957.
  Second release of "Ramrod"/"The Walker" by Jamie in 1958, Duane Eddy and The Rebels (Jamie 1109).

1958 songs
1958 singles
Songs written by Al Casey (rock & roll guitarist)
Duane Eddy songs
Song recordings produced by Lee Hazlewood
Song recordings produced by Lester Sill
Jamie Records singles
1950s instrumentals